Samia Sehabi (born 9 January 1981) is an Algerian team handball goalkeeper. She plays for the club GS Pétroliers, and on the Algerian national team. She competed at the 2013 World Women's Handball Championship in Serbia, where Algeria placed 22nd.

References

1981 births
Living people
Algerian female handball players
21st-century Algerian people